Ersin Mehmedović (born 10 May 1981) is a retired Serbian football player.

Romanian Champion with FC Unirea Urziceni (2009).

Career
Born in Novi Pazar, SR Serbia, then still within Yugoslavia, Mehmedović as defender was bought by the Liga 1 club FCU Politehnica Timişoara during the winter break of 2005 from Belgian side KAA Gent.  He was then loaned out to FC Naţional București for the whole 2005/06 season.  He returned to "Poli" when his loan ended. Despite earning himself a first team slot with Sorin Cârţu as manager, he was later dropped out of the squad and subsequently transferred to Unirea Urziceni in the summer of 2007. In February 2011, he signed a contract for six months with Dinamo București.

Honours
Unirea Urziceni
Liga I: 2008–09

References

External links
 
 
 

1981 births
Living people
Sportspeople from Novi Pazar
Bosniaks of Serbia
Serbian footballers
Association football defenders
Serbian expatriate footballers
FK Novi Pazar players
K.V. Mechelen players
K.A.A. Gent players
FC Politehnica Timișoara players
FC Progresul București players
FC Unirea Urziceni players
FC Dinamo București players
FC Taraz players
KF Vllaznia Shkodër players
Expatriate footballers in Slovenia
Expatriate footballers in Belgium
Expatriate footballers in Romania
Expatriate footballers in Kazakhstan
Expatriate footballers in Albania
Serbian expatriate sportspeople in Slovenia
Serbian expatriate sportspeople in Belgium
Serbian expatriate sportspeople in Romania
Serbian expatriate sportspeople in Kazakhstan
Serbian expatriate sportspeople in Albania
Liga I players
Belgian Pro League players
Kazakhstan Premier League players
Kategoria Superiore players
Slovenian PrvaLiga players